Kelvin Mitchell Korver (born February 21, 1949) is a former American football defensive tackle who played three seasons with the Oakland Raiders of the National Football League (NFL). He was drafted by the Raiders in the second round of the 1972 NFL Draft. Korver was a member of the Super Bowl XI Championship team. He first enrolled at Texas A&M University before transferring to Northwestern College. He received third-team honors on the 1970 Little All-America college football team. Korver attended Irving High School in Irving, Texas. Korver was inducted into the Irving Independent School District Athletic Hall of Fame Class of 2016.

References

External links
Just Sports Stats

Living people
1949 births
Players of American football from Dallas
American football defensive tackles
Texas A&M Aggies football players
Northwestern Red Raiders football players
Oakland Raiders players